The Temple (formally, the Hebrew Benevolent Congregation) is a Reform synagogue in Atlanta, Georgia. The oldest Jewish congregation in Atlanta, it was established in 1860 to serve the needs of German-Jewish immigrants. The Temple, designed by Philip Trammell Shutze in a Neoclassical style, was completed in 1931.

Previous temples of the congregation were located at:
1875–1902: Garnett and Forsyth Streets, downtown
1902–1929: South Pryor and Richardson Streets, Washington-Rawson neighborhood southeast of downtown

During the 1950s and 1960s, The Temple became a center for civil rights advocacy. In response, white supremacists bombed The Temple on October 12, 1958, with no injuries.  While arrests were made, there were no convictions. Atlanta Journal-Constitution editor Ralph McGill's outraged front-page column on the Temple bombing won a Pulitzer Prize for Editorial Writing. The Temple and the bombing event was used as a central theme in the film Driving Miss Daisy (1989).

Organ 
The Shutze temple opened in 1931 with a new Pilcher organ. In 1955, temple organist Emilie Spivey contracted Aeolian-Skinner to update and renovate the organ. The renovated organ, one of twelve in the country bearing G. Donald Harrison's signature plate, was dedicated October 14, 1955 with a performance of Ernest Bloch's Sacred Service. On Oct 30, 1955 Spivey played the opening recital of Mozart, Bloch, and Poulenc's organ concerto. The organ underwent a major renovation in 2011-2012.

References

External links

Synagogue website
The Temple at Atlanta Urban Design Commission
The Temple, National Park Service Atlanta

Jews and Judaism in Atlanta
Synagogues in Georgia (U.S. state)
Reform synagogues in Georgia (U.S. state)
Buildings and structures in Atlanta
Religion in Atlanta
German-American culture in Georgia (U.S. state)
German-Jewish culture in the United States
National Register of Historic Places in Atlanta
Synagogues on the National Register of Historic Places in Georgia (U.S. state)
Synagogues completed in 1931
1931 establishments in Georgia (U.S. state)
Neoclassical architecture in Georgia (U.S. state)
Neoclassical synagogues
20th-century attacks on synagogues and Jewish communal organizations in the United States